Michele Meyer is an American politician from Maine. Meyer, a Democrat from Eliot, has served in the Maine House of Representatives since 2019.

Political career 
Meyer was elected in the 2018 election. She represents District 2, which contains the towns of Eliot, Kittery and South Berwick.

Meyer endorsed Amy Klobuchar's presidential campaign in the 2020 Democratic Party presidential primaries.

Meyer has supported the investment into cannabis industry jobs in her district.

Meyer advocated for community engagement alongside social distancing during the COVID-19 pandemic in Maine.

Personal life 
Meyer has long lived in Eliot, Maine, and is also a registered nurse.

References

External links 
 Official website

Year of birth missing (living people)
Living people
21st-century American women politicians
21st-century American politicians
People from Eliot, Maine
Democratic Party members of the Maine House of Representatives
Women state legislators in Maine
Nurses from Maine